"Now" is a song by the American rock band Staind. It served as the third single from the band's self-titled seventh studio album Staind. The song was released on April 23, 2012. It's also featured in the video game NASCAR The Game: Inside Line as part of the soundtrack.

Track listing

Charts

Weekly charts

Year-end charts

References

2012 singles
2011 songs
Staind songs
Atlantic Records singles
Roadrunner Records singles
Songs written by Aaron Lewis
Song recordings produced by Johnny K
Songs written by Mike Mushok